Lordan may refer to:

Geography
Lordan, Iran, a village in Hormozgan Province, Iran

People
Given name
Lordan Zafranović (b. 1944), Yugoslav film director

Surname
Bill Lordan (b. 1947), American musician
Elaine Lordan (b. 1966), British actress
Cillian Lordan (b. 1982), Irish footballer
Jerry Lordan (1934-1995), English composer and singer
John Lordan, American long-distance runner